Pareiodon microps is a species of catfish (order Siluriformes) of the family Trichomycteridae, and the only species of the genus Pareiodon. It is endemic to Brazil where it occurs in the Amazon Basin.

References

Trichomycteridae
Taxa named by Rudolf Kner
Fish of South America
Fish of Brazil
Fish of the Amazon basin
Endemic fauna of Brazil
Fish described in 1855